Anna's War  is a 2018 Russian drama film directed by  Aleksey Fedorchenko. It  premiered at the International Film Festival Rotterdam in January 2018.

On 25 January 2019 the film won the Russian Golden Eagle Award in the Best Film category.

The plot was based on the short story Ghost by Dmitri Khotckevich, a true story of his neighbor pani Ada (missis Ada), which he published earlier at livejournal under the nick storyofgrubas.

Plot
A little girl, Anna (Marta Kozlova), miraculously survived the execution of local Jews, after her mother covered her with her body. She hides in the chimney of a Ukrainian school, which came to be used as the nazi's headquarters for the duration of the Nazi occupation. Anna watches war and life from her cover.

References

External links
 
 «Кинотавр». Печёная свастика и временные трудности

Russian war drama films
2018 war drama films
Eastern Front of World War II films
Films set in the 1940s
Holocaust films
2018 drama films
Films directed by Aleksey Fedorchenko
Russian World War II films
2010s Russian-language films